The 2000–01 season was the 51st season in the history of FC Utrecht and the club's 31st consecutive season in the top flight of Dutch football. In addition to the domestic league, FC Utrecht participated in this season's editions of the KNVB Cup.

Players

First-team squad

Transfers

In

Out

Pre-season and friendlies

Competitions

Overall record

Eredivisie

League table

Results summary

Results by round

Matches

KNVB Cup

Group stage 
Group 6

Second round

Third round

Round of 16

References

FC Utrecht seasons
FC Utrecht